Titus Gallus is an early Vergilian commentator, fl. in the 5th or 6th century.
He is known only from a mention in the Berne scholia, haec omnia de commentariis Romanorum congregavi, id est Titi Galli et Gaudentii et maxime Iunilii Flagrii Mediolanensis.

References
 Robert A. Kaster,  Guardians of Language: The Grammarian and Society in Late Antiquity, Berkeley:  University of California Press,  1997, p. 409. http://ark.cdlib.org/ark:/13030/ft8v19p2nc/

Virgil
5th-century Latin writers